54-40 (often stylized 54•40) is a Canadian alternative rock group from Tsawwassen, British Columbia. The band take their name from the slogan "54-40 or Fight!", coined to express the unsuccessful expansionist agenda of James K. Polk's presidency, which was intent upon controlling a contested U.S.-Canada border area in the Oregon boundary dispute. 54-40 has had a successful career, with four of their albums being certified Platinum in Canada. The band has been nominated for eight Juno Awards. Between 1996 and 2016, 54-40 were among the top 150 selling Canadian artists in Canada and among the top 50 selling Canadian bands in Canada.

History
Neil Osborne and Brad Merritt met in 1978 at South Delta High School in Tsawwassen, British Columbia. After studying at the Berklee College of Music in Boston, Osborne returned home and formed the band 54-40 with Merritt and drummer Ian Franey. The band played their first gig in Coquitlam on December 8, 1980, the night John Lennon was killed. That same year, they made their first recordings for the Mo-Da-Mu label, with four tracks appearing on the independent compilation LP Things Are Still Coming Ashore, which also featured music by Vancouver bands Animal Slaves and Junco Run. In June 1982, the band released the EP Selection. Shortly after the release of Selection, Franey left the band. Franey was replaced by Darryl Neudorf and Phil Comparelli was added on guitar, trumpet and vocals. The band recorded the album Set the Fire in 1983, releasing it in 1984. Neudorf, frustrated with the band's prolonged time in the studio and away from the road, left the band in 1985. He was replaced by Matt Johnson. 

The band's self-titled second album, released in 1986 through Warner/Reprise Records, began to attract attention from radio and record buyers across Canada, with the singles "Baby Ran" and "I Go Blind" gaining significant college radio airplay. Dave Osborne (keyboards, harmonica), toured and recorded with the band from 1987 to 1993. The band's third album, Show Me, became their commercial breakthrough in Canada, with the hits "One Day in Your Life" and "One Gun".

Although the band was popular on college radio in the United States, they never had a commercial breakthrough, and Warner dropped 54-40 in 1990. In 1991, the band released the compilation album, Sweeter Things. Also during that year, the band signed a deal with Sony and released Dear Dear in 1992. It was the band's first album to be certified Gold in Canada and was certified Platinum in 1993. The band released Smilin' Buddha Cabaret in 1994 and Trusted by Millions in 1996, both of which would later be certified Platinum.

The band's song "I Go Blind" was covered in the mid-1990s by American band Hootie & the Blowfish, and was featured on the first soundtrack to the TV series Friends. The song also appears on two compilations released by the band: 2000's Scattered, Smothered and Covered and 2003's The Best of Hootie & the Blowfish (1993 Thru 2003). Royalties from the Hootie and the Blowfish cover enabled the band to build their own recording studio in Vancouver.

Dave Genn, formerly of Matthew Good Band, joined 54-40 in 2003. In February 2005, it was announced that Comparelli left the band due to personal reasons. That same year, 54-40 signed with True North Records.

In 2010, to celebrate the band's 30 years together and almost 25 years since their first commercial album The Green Album, the band went on a promotional concert tour with a two-set act. The first set was The Green Album from start to finish. The second set was one song from every album since, with the exception of Dear Dear where they played two songs. 54-40 also performed a new song from their upcoming record, Lost in the City, which was released on June 14, 2011.

In January 2016, the band released a greatest hits album titled La Difference: A History Unplugged. Tracks included "One Day In Your Life", "I Go Blind", and "Ocean Pearl". The album was released through eOne Music. The band then set out on a month-long theatre tour across Canada to support the album. In 2017 they played at Peachfest in Penticton.

In 2018 54-40 performed with fiddler Daniel Lapp, both locally and also as the opening band at Ottawa's CityFolk Festival.

Lead singer Neil Osborne began playing shows with his daughter, singer-songwriter Kandle, billing themselves as A Family Curse, self-described as "pure folk-art worked from found objects (something old, something new)." A Toronto show took place May 8, 2019 at the intimate and tiny 20-capacity Radical Road Brewing Co. The father-daughter duo played later that year on August 7, 2019 as part of Roy Thompson Hall's Live on the Patio series, also in Toronto. These shows were bookended by shows in Montréal, where Kandle resides, in February and August 2019.

54-40 played the legendary Horseshoe Tavern's 72nd anniversary party on December 6, 2019. Sam Cash, son of Toronto post-punk musician turned city politician Andrew Cash, opened the show.

Members
Current
Neil Osborne – vocals, rhythm guitar (1980–present), lead guitar (1981–1983)
Dave Genn – lead guitar (2003–present)
Brad Merrit – bass (1980–present)
Matt Johnson – drums (1986–present)
David Osborne - organ, saxophone, harmonica (2015-present)

Former
Ian Franey – drums (1980–1983)
Phil Comparelli – lead guitar, vocals, trumpet (1983–2005)
Darryl Neudorf – drums (1983–1986)

Timeline

Discography

EPs

Albums

Singles

"How's Your Day Going?- Keep On Walking (2018)

"Northern Soul"- Northern Soul (2008)

Live

Compilations

DVDs
 2006 – This Is Here This Is Now

References

External links 
 
54-40 entry at Trouser Press
 
 Entry at canadianbands.com
 

Canadian alternative rock groups
Musical groups established in 1980
Musical groups from Vancouver
1980 establishments in British Columbia
Reprise Records artists
True North Records artists